David Dench (born 23 August 1951) is a former Australian rules footballer in the (then) Victorian Football League.  He played his whole career with North Melbourne Football Club during one of its most successful periods.

VFL career
Dench played full-back. He was recruited from the  West Coburg. Dench won the North Melbourne club's best and fairest award, the Syd Barker Medal, on four occasions -  1971, 1976, 1977, 1981. In 1972 David Dench at the age of 21 he became one of the youngest captains appointed in the Kangaroo's history. He also captained the 1977 premiership team, due to Keith Greig's absence because of an injury. In the 1977 VFL Grand Final, Ron Barassi moved him to the forward line, where he sparked North Melbourne Football Club's revival by contributing to the forward line and kicking goals, to draw with Collingwood Football Club.

A graphic and comical photograph of Dench smothering of a kick by South Melbourne's John Roberts was made in 1981 by Michael Rayner of The Age which won the Nikon Awards Best Sports Photograph of the Year.

In 1984 Dench was told by his coach Barry Cable that his playing days were numbered and was going to play out the season in the reserves. Dench was not happy with this so he grabbed his gear and went home and retired. His relationship with Cable has been fractured ever since, with Dench refusing to speak to Cable again.

When John (Kanga) Kennedy was appointed coach he tried to convince Dench to play again but the condition of his knees was poor and he stayed as an assistant coach.

Post AFL career and personal life
In 2000 Dench was inducted into the Australian Football Hall of Fame.

His daughter, Michelle is a distinguished Australian sportswoman. She played high level basketball before taking up Australian football playing over 100 games for her club Melbourne University. She also represented Victoria and Australia as well as captaining her club to a premiership. 

In 2008, Dench served 4 months in jail for his minor role in a scheme to defraud Victoria University out of millions of dollars.

References

External links
 AFL Hall of Fame

North Melbourne Football Club players
North Melbourne Football Club Premiership players
Australian Football Hall of Fame inductees
Syd Barker Medal winners
Australian white-collar criminals
1951 births
Living people
Australian rules footballers from Victoria (Australia)
Victorian State of Origin players
Two-time VFL/AFL Premiership players